Sunil Dutt (born Balraj Dutt; 6 June 1929 — 25 May 2005) was an Indian actor, film producer, director and politician. Dutt was one of the major stars of Hindi cinema in the late 1950s and 1960s and continued to star in many successful films which included Mother India (1957) Sadhna (1958),  Insan Jaag Utha (1959), Sujata (1959), Mujhe Jeene Do (1963),  Gumraah (1963), Waqt (1965), Khandan (1965), Mera Saaya (1966) and Padosan (1967),  and Hamraaz (1967), Heera (1973), Pran Jaye Par Vachan Na Jaye (1974), Nagin (1976), Jaani Dushman  (1979), Muqabla (1979), and Shaan (1980). In 1968, he was honoured by the Padma Shri by the Government of India. He is the father of actor Sanjay Dutt.

In 1984 he joined the Indian National Congress party and was elected to the Parliament of India for five terms from the constituency of Mumbai North West. He was the Minister of Youth Affairs and Sports in the Manmohan Singh government (2004–2005) and also a former Sheriff of Mumbai.

Early life
Sunil Dutt was born on 6 June 1929 in Nakka Khurd, Jhelum District, Punjab Province, British India (now in Punjab, Pakistan) into a Mohyal Brahmin family as Balraj Dutt to father Diwan Raghunath Dutt and mother Kulwantidevi Dutt. When he was five years old, Dutt's father died. When he was 18, the Partition of India began inciting Hindu-Muslim violence across the country.  A Muslim friend of Dutt's father named Yakub, saved their entire family. The family resettled in the small village of Mandauli on the bank of the river Yamuna located in Yamunanagar District, East Punjab, which is now a district in Haryana. Later he moved to Lucknow, United Provinces with his mother, Kulwantidevi Dutt, and spent a long time in the Aminabad Bazaar neighbourhood during graduation. He then moved to Bombay, Bombay State, where he joined Jai Hind College, University of Bombay in Churchgate, South Bombay as an undergraduate and took up a job at the city's BEST Transportation Engineering division. He graduated with B.A. (Hons.) in History in 1954.

Early career
Starting out in radio, with his command over the Urdu language, Sunil Dutt was hugely popular on the Hindi service of Radio Ceylon, the oldest radio station in South Asia. He moved to act in Hindi films and got introduced to the industry in 1955's Railway Platform.

Film career

Debut and coining of the screen name "Sunil Dutt"
Director Ramesh Saigal was instrumental in giving Dutt a break in the film Railway Platform (1955) when the latter was hosting the show, Lipton Ki Mehfil on Radio Ceylon. While covering the Dilip Kumar film Shikast in 1953, Dutt met director Saigal, who impressed by his personality and voice, offered him a role in his upcoming film. Saigal came up with the new screen name "Sunil Dutt" for the debutante actor whose real name was Balraj Dutt to avoid name conflicts with the then veteran actor Balraj Sahni.

Rise to stardom

Dutt shot to stardom in the 1957 film Mother India in which he co-starred with Nargis as her short-tempered, angry son. During the making of this film, a fire happened on the set. It is believed that Dutt braved the raging fire to save Nargis and thereby won her love. They went on to marry in 1958. They had one son Sanjay Dutt, also a successful film actor, and two daughters, Priya Dutt and Namrata Dutt. His daughter Namrata married Kumar Gaurav, son of Rajendra Kumar. The two fathers were co-stars in Mother India.

Dutt was one of the major stars of Hindi cinema in the late 1950s and 1960s and continued to star in many successful films which included Sadhna (1958),  Insan Jaag Utha (1959), Sujata (1959), Mujhe Jeene Do (1963), Khandan (1965), Mera Saaya (1966) and Padosan (1967). His collaboration with B.R. Chopra proved to be successful in films such as Gumraah (1963), Waqt (1965) and Hamraaz (1967). One of his favourite writers and friends was Aghajani Kashmeri. Dutt made his directorial debut and was the only actor to feature in the 1964 film Yaadein. The film was featured in the Guinness Book of Records for Fewest Actors in a Narrative Film. He later produced the 1968 film Man Ka Meet which introduced his brother Som Dutt, Vinod Khanna and Leena Chandavarkar. In 1971, he produced, directed and starred in Reshma Aur Shera (1971) which was critically well received but a box office failure.

During the early 1970s, his career as an actor was at a stand-still. Amidst this setback, he played Madhubala's hero in the 1971 film Jwala, which was a delayed film that had started production in the late 1950s and was Madhubala's last film. It was Geeta Mera Naam (1974) that brought him into the limelight again. The anti-hero was reborn after a long gap of films like Mother India and Mujhe Jeene Do. Sunil Dutt's performance of Johnny was liked by the masses as he clearly stole the limelight. It was one of the best performances of his career. He continued to star in hits that included Heera (1973), Pran Jaye Par Vachan Na Jaye (1974), Nagin (1976), Jaani Dushman  (1979), Muqabla (1979), and Shaan (1980). He also starred in a series of Punjabi religious movies in the 1970s: Man Jeete Jag Jeet (1973), Dukh Bhanjan Tera Naam (1974), and Sat Sri Akal (1977). Even in 1980s he starred in both leading and supporting role in several successful movies such as Dard Ka Rishta (1982), Badle Ki Aag (1982), Raaj Tilak (1984), Mangal Dada (1986), Watan Ke Rakhwale (1987) and Dharamyudh (1988).

He launched his son Sanjay's career with Rocky in 1981 which was a success. Shortly before the film's release, Nargis died of pancreatic cancer. He founded the Nargis Dutt Foundation in her memory for the curing of cancer patients. He was a sponsor of the India Project, an organisation akin to Operation Smile for the treatment of Indian children with facial deformities.

In 1982, he was appointed as the Sheriff of Bombay, an apolitical titular position bestowed on him by the Maharashtra government for a year.

He retired from the film industry in the early 1990s to turn to politics after his last few releases including Yash Chopra's Parampara (1993) and J.P. Dutta's Kshatriya (1993). 

In 1995, he won the Filmfare Lifetime Achievement Award for his contribution to the film industry for four decades. He returned to acting shortly before his death in 2003's Munna Bhai M.B.B.S. in which he shared the screen with his son Sanjay for the first time although they had appeared earlier in Rocky and Kshatriya but did not share any scenes together.

His closest friends from the film industry included Dilip Kumar, Dev Anand, Rajendra Kumar, Kishore Kumar, Lata Mangeshkar, Yash Chopra, Waheeda Rehman and Sanjeev Kumar.

Political career
In 1987, Sunil Dutt undertook Mahashanti Padyatra from Bombay to Amritsar (Golden Temple) to establish harmony and brotherhood when Punjab was facing heightened militancy. He reached Amritsar after walking 2000 km for 78 days from Bombay, and was accompanied by his daughter Priya Dutt and 80 other individuals in that Mahashanti Padyatra. Dutt overcame terrible heat, a bout of jaundice and blistered feet to address more than 500 roadside meetings during the padyatra. His political career was halted for some years in the early 1990s when he worked to free his son from jail after he was arrested for keeping an AK-56 that he claimed was for the protection of his family after bomb blasts in Bombay. An ardent devotee of Purneswari Maa Tara Tarini & Bhairavi, he visited Maa's Temple in Ganjam, Odisha once with former Prime Minister PV Narasimha Rao and later many times alone for the release of Sanjay Dutt. Soon after Sunil Dutt's prayers at Maa Tara Tarini Shakti Peetha, Sanjay was miraculously released from Jail.

Death

Dutt died of a heart attack on 25 May 2005 at his residence in Bandra, West Mumbai, two weeks before his 76th birthday, At the time of his death, he was the Minister for Youth Affairs and Sports in the Union Government led by Dr. Manmohan Singh and was the Member of Parliament from North-West Mumbai. He was cremated with full state honours at Santacruz Crematorium in Mumbai. He was succeeded as Minister by Mani Shankar Aiyar. His seat in the Parliament was contested by his daughter, Priya Dutt, who won it and was a Member of Parliament until May 2014.

In popular culture
Paresh Rawal played the role of Dutt in the biopic on his son titled Sanju (2018).

Awards and honours
 1963 – Filmfare Award for Best Actor for Mujhe Jeene Do
 1964 – National Film Award for Best Feature Film in Hindi for Yaadein
 1965 – Filmfare Award for Best Actor for Khandan
 1967 – BFJA Award for Best Actor (Hindi) for Milan
 1968 – Padma Shri
 1982 – Sheriff of Bombay
 1995 – Filmfare Lifetime Achievement Award
 1998 – Rajiv Gandhi National Sadbhavana Award
 1999 – Screen Lifetime Achievement Award
 2000 – Anandalok Awards Lifetime Achievement Award
 2001 – Zee Cine Award for Lifetime Achievement
 2007 – Glory of India Award by IIFS, London.

Filmography 
As an Actor

See also
 Radio Ceylon
 List of Hindi broadcasters of Radio Ceylon

Further reading
 Mr. and Mrs. Dutt: Memories of our Parents, Namrata Dutt Kumar and Priya Dutt, 2007, Roli Books. .
 Darlingji: The True Love Story of Nargis and Sunil Dutt, Kishwar Desai. 2007, Harper Collins. .

References

External links

 

1929 births
2005 deaths
Indian National Congress politicians from Maharashtra
People from Jhelum
Indian male film actors
Male actors in Hindi cinema
Film producers from Mumbai
20th-century Indian film directors
Indian male radio actors
Recipients of the Padma Shri in arts
Sheriffs of Mumbai
Indian actor-politicians
Male actors in Punjabi cinema
India MPs 2004–2009
India MPs 1984–1989
India MPs 1989–1991
India MPs 1991–1996
India MPs 1999–2004
Hindi-language film directors
Male actors from Mumbai
Lok Sabha members from Maharashtra
Members of the Cabinet of India
20th-century Indian male actors
Film directors from Mumbai
Punjabi people
Pahari Pothwari people
Jai Hind College alumni
Filmfare Awards winners
Filmfare Lifetime Achievement Award winners